Antroni is a mountain village and a community in the municipal unit of Lasiona, Elis, Greece. The community consists of the villages Antroni, Panopoulo, Zachareika and Chania Spartoulia. Antroni is situated near the Foloi oak forest, on a small plateau between deep and narrow river valleys. It is 1 km north of Foloi, 10 km southwest of Lampeia and 19 km northeast of Olympia. The Greek National Road 33 (Patras - Tripoli) runs through Panopoulo and Chania Spartoulia. 

According to Greek mythology Heracles used a net to catch the Erymanthian Boar in a gorge near Antroni. Antroni was part of the municipality of Lampeia between the 1830s and 1912. It was an independent community until the 1998, when it joined the new municipality of Lasiona. This in turn became part of the municipality Archaia Olympia in 2011.

Population

See also

List of settlements in Elis

External links
The Antroni Homepage 
The Koumani Homepage 
Antroni GTP Travel Pages

References

Populated places in Elis